Vicentina is a municipality located in the Brazilian state of Mato Grosso do Sul. Its population was 6,109 (2020) and its area is 310 km².

References

Municipalities in Mato Grosso do Sul